Chattahoochee is a 1989 American drama film directed by Mick Jackson and starring Gary Oldman and Dennis Hopper. The film is based on the experiences of Chris Calhoun during his internment in a Florida state mental institution. It was turned down by several major studios before being accepted by Hemdale Film Corporation, a small British-owned, Los Angeles-based company that also produced Platoon, Hoosiers, The Last Emperor, and Salvador.

Plot
Emmett Foley is an American hero of the Korean War who attempts to commit suicide, first by provoking local police and then by shooting himself in the chest. After his recovery, he is sent to the Florida State Hospital, an institution in Chattahoochee, Florida, where he fights against doctors and staff who are terrorizing and torturing their patients. His efforts eventually led to sweeping reforms in the Florida mental health system.

Cast
 Gary Oldman as Emmett Foley
 Dennis Hopper as Walker Benson
 Frances McDormand as Mae Foley
 Pamela Reed as Earlene
 Ned Beatty as Dr. Harwood
 M. Emmet Walsh as Morris
 Lee Wilkof as Vernon
 Matt Craven as Lonny
 Richard Portnow as Dr. Debner
 Wilbur Fitzgerald as Duane
 William Newman as Jonathan

Basis
The main character, Emmitt Foley, is a fictional character based on Chris Calhoun. Chattahoochee appeared in theaters nationwide May 11, 1990. 
Another famous person institutionalized at Chattahoochee was Ruby McCollum, the African-American woman who shot state senator-elect, Dr. C. Leroy Adams in 1952. Her case brought many of these same practices to light.

Reception
Chattahoochee appeared in theaters nationwide May 11, 1990. (Theatrical Release Date: April 20, 1990)The film holds an 11% rating at Rotten Tomatoes based on 9 reviews, with an average score of 4.6/10. Oldman compared the responses to Chattahoochee and his 1986 film Sid and Nancy, feeling the former was underappreciated and the latter overrated. He described Chattahoochee as "really good" work.

See also
 Ruby McCollum

Notes

External links
 
 
 Chattahoochee at ofdb.de

1989 films
1989 directorial debut films
1989 independent films
1980s American films
1980s English-language films
American drama films
American independent films
Films directed by Mick Jackson
Mental health in the United States